Huang Yee-ling (born Huang Ming-chu on 20 September 1969) is a Taiwanese Hokkien pop singer. She has released 32 Hokkien pop albums since 1987, and 3 Japanese albums between 1988 and 1990.

She won Golden Melody Award for Best Female Hokkien singer a record 4 times (tied with Jody Chiang), in 1999 (10th), 2006 (17th), 2009 (20th), and 2014 (25th).

External links

Musicians from New Taipei
Taiwanese Hokkien pop singers
1969 births
Japanese-language singers
Living people
Tibetan Buddhists from Taiwan
20th-century Taiwanese women singers
21st-century Taiwanese women singers